Dagestanskaya (Dəġystan) is a rural locality (a stanitsa) in Krasnooktyabrskoye Rural Settlement of Maykopsky District, Russia. The population was 495 as of 2018. There are 19 streets.

Geography 
The stanitsa is located on the Kurdzhips River, 34 km southwest of Tulsky (the district's administrative centre) by road. Krasny Dagestan is the nearest rural locality.

References 

Rural localities in Maykopsky District